Fifty Fifty (stylized in all caps) is a South Korean girl group formed by Attrakt in 2022. The group consists of four members: Saena, Aran, Keena, and Sio. Fifty Fifty debuted on November 18, 2022, with the single "Higher" from their first extended play The Fifty.

Name 
The group's name, Fifty Fifty, means "50 ideal vs. 50 reality", which delivers a message that there is a 50% chance of reality and a 50% chance of dream, and also they hope to be a whole 100 with their fans. Defined by the agency as a "bright, hope-filled ideal that coexists in life with a painful, hardship-filled reality, the album that Fifty Fifty will present contains vague anxiety about the future and exciting anticipation simultaneously."

History

Pre-debut 
Prior to the group's debut, Saena participated as a contestant on KBS' dancing competition show . She was part of Hoya's team.

2022–present: Introduction and debut with The Fifty 
On November 14, 2022, Fifty Fifty announced that they would be debuting in November 2022 by releasing the group's official logo image posted across all the group's social media accounts. The same day, a pre-released music video for the song "Lovin Me" was released on their official YouTube channel. The members were revealed on November 15 through the concept photo of their debut album, which revealed the names and the debut date, and official photos of the members for the first time. A performance video of "Log In" was also released the same day.

Fifty Fifty released their debut extended play (EP) The Fifty on November 18, 2022, with "Higher" serving as the lead single. The album contains the first journey of girls who yearn for freedom beyond the chaos of reality and eventually move on to a utopia. It consists of four tracks – "Higher", which has an R&B pop feeling that sings about the world of ecstasy and dreams, "Tell Me", a city pop song, "Lovin Me", which conveys a message of comfort to young people who are going through growing pains, and "Log In", which expresses the movements of girls who rebel to escape from the suffocating real world with intense performances. Promotions for the extended play's release began on November 22 with their music broadcast debut on SBS M's The Show and ended on KBS2's Music Bank on December 2. Their debut performances left a strong impression with positive comments about their live vocal performances and received praise from fans in India and Indonesia. The EP did not enter the Circle Album Chart when it was first released, but it debuted at number forty-four on the chart issue dated December 18–24, 2022, with 2,597 album sales. Korean critic magazine IZM rated the album 4.5 out of 5 stars, the highest rating the magazine has ever given to a girl group. The writer, Son Seung-geun, opined that Fifty Fifty "is a good example of what happens when great songs and good singers meet. Thanks to them, Korea has one more good girl group."

Fifty Fifty was selected as one of The Recording Academy's K-pop Girl Groups To Watch in 2023, writing, "the quartet displays various colors and a vocal maturity that is both hard to find and crucial to have." They were also named one of the best K-pop debuts of the year by Rolling Stone India, and "Tell Me" and "Lovin Me" were featured on the lists of the best K-pop songs of 2022 compiled by Paper and Mashable, respectively.

On February 24, 2023, the group released its first single album, The Beginning: Cupid, along with the music video for title track "Cupid". The song, which was recorded both in Korean and English, saw Keena writing part of the Korean lyrics. Music critic Kim Yoon-ha noted how "Cupid" highlighted the vocals, putting them to the forefront instead of considering the voice as one of several instruments, stating that this approach reminded her of the Korean songs of the late 2000s rather than modern K-pop. So Seung-geun of IZM gave the song 4.5 out of 5 stars, writing that Fifty Fifty had found their own color.

Members 

 Saena – leader, dancer, rapper
 Aran – vocalist, rapper
 Keena – rapper, vocalist
 Sio – dancer, vocalist

Discography

Extended plays

Single albums

Singles

Videography

Music videos

Other videos

Filmography

Web shows

References

External links 
  

2022 establishments in South Korea
K-pop music groups
Musical groups from Seoul
Musical groups established in 2022
South Korean girl groups
South Korean dance music groups
South Korean pop music groups